Constitutional Assembly elections were held in Uruguay on 25 June 1933. They followed a presidential coup by Gabriel Terra on 31 March, Following the coup, the Assembly was appointed to formulate a new constitution. The various factions of the Colorado Party emerged as the largest group in the Assembly, winning 151 of the 284 seats.

Results

Aftermath
The Assembly produced a new constitution which was approved in a referendum, and promulgated the following year. It abolished the National Council of Administration, replacing it with a nine-member Council of Ministers, in which the second party was guaranteed three members. It also gave the party that had finished second in parliamentary elections half the seats in the Senate.

References

Elections in Uruguay
Uruguay
Constitutional
Uruguay
Election and referendum articles with incomplete results